A carnivore , or meat-eater (Latin, caro, genitive carnis, meaning meat or "flesh" and vorare meaning "to devour"), is an animal or plant whose food and energy requirements derive from animal tissues (mainly muscle, fat and other soft tissues) whether through hunting or scavenging.

Nomenclature

Mammal order
The technical term for mammals in the order Carnivora is carnivoran, and they are so-named because most member species in the group have a carnivorous diet, but the similarity of the name of the order and the name of the diet causes confusion.

Many but not all carnivorans are meat eaters; a few, such as the large and small cats (felidae) are obligate carnivores (see below). Other classes of carnivore are highly variable. The Ursids, for example: While the Arctic polar bear eats meat almost exclusively (more than 90% of its diet is meat), almost all other bear species are omnivorous, and one species, the giant panda, is nearly exclusively herbivorous.

Dietary carnivory is not a distinguishing trait of the order: Many mammals with highly carnivorous diets are not members of the order Carnivora. Cetaceans, for example, all eat other animals, but are paradoxically members of the almost exclusively plant-eating hooved mammals.

Carnivorous diet
Animals that depend solely on animal flesh for their nutrient requirements are called hypercarnivores or obligate carnivores, while those that also consume non-animal food are called mesocarnivores, or facultative carnivores, or omnivores (there are no clear distinctions). A carnivore at the top of the food chain (adults not preyed upon by other animals) is termed an apex predator, regardless of whether it is an obligate or facultative carnivore.

Outside the animal kingdom, there are several genera containing carnivorous plants (predominantly insectivores) and several phyla containing carnivorous fungi (preying mostly on microscopic invertebrates, such as nematodes, amoebae, and springtails).

Subcategories of carnivory
Carnivores are sometimes characterized by their type of prey. For example, animals that eat mainly insects and similar invertebrates are called insectivores, while those that eat mainly fish are called piscivores.

Carnivores may alternatively be classified according to the percentage of meat in their diet. The diet of a hypercarnivore consists of more than 70% meat, that of a mesocarnivore 30–70%, and that of a hypocarnivore less than 30%, with the balance consisting of non-animal foods, such as fruits, other plant material, or fungi.

Omnivores also consume both animal and non-animal food, and apart from their more general definition, there is no clearly defined ratio of plant vs. animal material that distinguishes a facultative carnivore from an omnivore.

Obligate carnivores

Obligate or "true" carnivores are those whose diet requires nutrients found only in animal flesh. While obligate carnivores might be able to ingest small amounts of plant matter, they lack the necessary physiology required to fully digest it. Some obligate carnivorous mammals will ingest vegetation as an emetic, to self-induce vomiting the food that upset their stomachs.

Obligate carnivores are diverse. The amphibian axolotl consumes mainly worms and larvae in its environment, but if necessary will consume algae. All felids, including the domestic cat, require a diet of primarily animal flesh and organs. Specifically, cats have high protein requirements and their metabolisms appear unable to synthesize essential nutrients such as retinol, arginine, taurine, and arachidonic acid; thus, in nature, they must consume flesh to supply these nutrients.

Characteristics of carnivores 
Characteristics commonly associated with carnivores include strength, speed, and keen senses for hunting, as well as teeth and claws for capturing and tearing prey. However, some carnivores do not hunt and are scavengers, lacking the physical characteristics to bring down prey; in addition, most hunting carnivores will scavenge when the opportunity arises. Carnivores have comparatively short digestive systems, as they are not required to break down the tough cellulose found in plants.

Many hunting animals have evolved eyes facing forward, enabling depth perception. This is almost universal among mammalian predators, while most reptile and amphibian predators have eyes facing sideways.

Prehistory of carnivory

Predation (the eating of one living creature by another for nutrition) predates the rise of commonly recognized carnivores by hundreds of millions (perhaps billions) of years. Indeed: It began with single-celled organisms, before multicellular creatures, and so carnivory predates the clear distinction between plants and animals (herbivory / carnivory).

Proterozoic origin
The earliest predators were microbial organisms, which engulfed or grazed on others. Because the earliest fossil record is the poorest, these first predators could date back anywhere between 1 and over 2.7 Gya (billion years ago).

The rise of eukaryotic cells at around 2.7 Gya, the rise of multicellular organisms at about 2 Gya, and the rise of mobile predators (around 600 Mya – 2 Gya, probably around 1 Gya) have all been attributed to early predatory behavior, and many very early remains show evidence of boreholes or other markings attributed to small predator species.

Devonian land-predators
Among more familiar species, the first vertebrate carnivores were fish, and then amphibians that moved on to land. Early tetrapods were large amphibious piscivores.
The first tetrapods, or land-dwelling vertebrates, were piscivorous amphibians called labyrinthodonts. They gave rise to insectivorous vertebrates and, later, to predators of other tetrapods.

Some scientists assert that Dimetrodon "was the first terrestrial vertebrate to develop the curved, serrated teeth that enable a predator to eat prey much larger than itself." While amphibians continued to feed on fish and later insects, reptiles began exploring two new food types: tetrapods (carnivory) and then plants (herbivory). Carnivory was a natural transition from insectivory for medium and large tetrapods, requiring minimal adaptation; in contrast, a complex set of adaptations was necessary for feeding on highly fibrous plant materials.

Mesozoic
In the Mesozoic, some theropod dinosaurs such as Tyrannosaurus rex are thought probably to have been obligate carnivores.

Though the theropods were the larger carnivores, several carnivorous mammal groups were already present. Most notable are the gobiconodontids, the triconodontid Jugulator, the deltatheroidans and Cimolestes. Many of these, such as Repenomamus, Jugulator and Cimolestes, were among the largest mammals in their faunal assemblages, capable of attacking dinosaurs.

Cenozoic
In the early-to-mid-Cenozoic, the dominant predator forms were mammals: hyaenodonts, oxyaenids, entelodonts, ptolemaiidans, arctocyonids and mesonychians, representing a great diversity of eutherian carnivores in the northern continents and Africa. In South America, sparassodonts were dominant, while Australia saw the presence of several marsupial predators, such as the dasyuromorphs and thylacoleonids. From the Miocene to the present, the dominant carnivorous mammals have been carnivoramorphs.

Most carnivorous mammals, from dogs to deltatheridiums, share several dental adaptations, such as carnassialiforme teeth, long canines and even similar tooth replacement patterns. Most aberrant are thylacoleonids, with a diprodontan dentition completely unlike that of any other mammal; and eutriconodonts like gobiconodontids and Jugulator, with a three-cusp anatomy which nevertheless functioned similarly to carnassials.

See also
 Mesocarnivore
 Herbivore

References

Further reading
 

Biological interactions
 
Animals by eating behaviors
Ethology